The 2023 Nova Scotia Scotties Tournament of Hearts, the provincial women's curling championship for Nova Scotia, was held from January 26 to 29 at the Bluenose Curling Club in New Glasgow, Nova Scotia. The event was held in conjunction with the 2023 Nova Scotia Tankard, the men's provincial championship. The winning Christina Black rink represented Nova Scotia at the 2023 Scotties Tournament of Hearts, Canada's national women's curling championship in Kamloops, British Columbia where they finished fourth overall losing to eventual champion Team Canada 9–4 in the 3 vs. 4 page playoff.

Just like the previous year, there was no preliminary round to qualify for the provincial championship. Any team was able to register to compete in the championship.

Teams
The teams are listed as follows:

Knockout brackets

Source:

A event

B event

C event

Knockout results
All draw times listed in Atlantic Time (UTC−04:00).

Draw 1
Thursday, January 26, 4:00 pm

Draw 2
Friday, January 27, 8:00 am

Draw 3
Friday, January 27, 4:00 pm

Draw 4
Saturday, January 28, 8:00 am

Draw 5
Saturday, January 28, 4:00 pm

Draw 7
Sunday, January 29, 9:00 am

Draw 8
Sunday, January 29, 2:00 pm

Playoffs

Source:

Semifinal
Sunday, January 29, 7:00 pm

Final
 Not needed as Team Black would've needed to be beaten twice

References

2023 in Nova Scotia
Curling in Nova Scotia
2023 Scotties Tournament of Hearts
January 2023 sports events in Canada
New Glasgow, Nova Scotia